Thirumanam ( "The Wedding") is an Indian Tamil language drama airing on Colors Tamil. It premiered on 8 October 2018 to 16 October 2020  The show stars Shreya Anchan and Sidhu. This series is a remake of Agnisakshi, an Indian Kannada television drama that premiered on Colors Kannada on 2 December 2013.

Cast

Main  
 Shreya Anchan as Janani Santhosh − Santhosh's wife
 Sidhu Sid as Santhosh − Janani's husband; Shakti's ex-lover

Recurring 
 Sherin Jaanu as Shakti − Santhosh's ex-lover 
 Preethi Sharma (2018 − 2020) as Anitha Naveen − Santhosh's younger sister-in-law; Janani's younger sister; Naveen's wife
 Vidhya Chandran (2020) as Anitha Naveen (Replacement of Preethi Sharma)
 Deepak Chinky as Naveen − Santhosh's younger brother; Anitha's husband
 Indumathy Manikandan as Maya − Santhosh's elder sister-in-law; Harish's wife
 Vedha Doss as Harish − Santhosh's elder brother; Maya's husband
 Sivalingam Babu as Srinivasan − Santhosh's father
 Reysha as Shwetha − Santhosh's younger sister
 Tina as Aarthi − Maya's younger sister
 Britto as Gautham − Santhosh's friend
 Manoj Kumar as Lakshmanan − Janani's father
 Kiruba as Sumathi − Janani's mother
 Hari Krishnan as Vinodh − Janani's elder brother; Vaani's husband
 Rekha Angelina as Vaani − Janani's elder sister-in-law; Vinodh's wife
 Maithreyan as Anand − Janani's cousin

Special appearance 
 Soori as Himself  
 Urvashi as Marriage counselor
 Neelima Rani

Awards and nominations

References

External links 

Colors Tamil original programming
Tamil-language romance television series
2018 Tamil-language television series debuts
Tamil-language television shows
Tamil-language television series based on Kannada-language television series
2020 Tamil-language television series endings